Burtinle, also known as Bur Tinle or Buurtinleh, is a city in the Nugal region of Puntland in northeastern Somalia.

Overview
Burtinle is the center of the Burtinle District. It lies in between Galkayo and Garoowe, close to the border with Ethiopia. The city was established in the early 1920s by Ugaas Gelle Maxamed Kaneec of the Awrtable. Burtinle consists of 7 neighborhoods namely: Tinka Dheer in which the city is named, Kaantaroolka, Booray, Tuulo Ciise, Xafatul Carab, Buur Karoole, and Godqol Weyne

The region is home to a few tribes. It's dominated by the Muuse Ibrahim sub-clan of the Awrtable and is also consists of the Cumar Maxamuud sub-clan of the Majeerteen. The city also hosts the Madhibaan tribe of Gabooye.

Education
Burtinle has a number of academic institutions. According to the Puntland Ministry of Education, there are currently 16 primary schools in the Burtinle District. Among these are Hormud, Imamu Shafici, Magacley and Meraysane. Secondary schools in the area include Burtinle High.

Economy
In March 2015, the Ministry of Labour, Youth and Sports in conjunction with the European Union and World Vision launched the Nugal Empowerment for Better Livelihood Project in the Burtinle, Garowe, Dangorayo, Eyl and Godobjiran districts of Puntland. The three-year initiative is valued at $3 million EUR, and is part of the New Deal Compact for Somalia. It aims buttress the regional economic sector through business support, training and non-formal education programs, community awareness workshops, and mentoring and networking drives.

References

External links
Burtinle, Nugaal, Somalia
Bur Tinle, Somalia

Populated places in Nugal, Somalia